The president of the National Assembly of Serbia is the presiding officer of the National Assembly of Serbia. The president is elected by members of each new assembly for a term lasting four years

The president of the National Assembly serves as acting president of Serbia if the elected president vacates the office before the expiration of the 5-year presidential term due to death, resignation or removal from office.

Duties and competences
According to the article 104 of the Constitution of Serbia:
 The National Assembly, by a majority vote of all deputies, elect the president and one or more vice presidents of the National Assembly.
 President of the National Assembly represents the National Assembly, convenes its meetings, presides over them and perform other duties stipulated by the Constitution, the law and the rules of the National Assembly.

List of presidents

Monarchy

Republic

Source:

* Incumbent's time in office last updated: .

Fathers of the House

Traditionally when a new Serbian parliament is formed the eldest deputy opens and leads the first session until a speaker is elected. Since the 2000 parliamentary election these deputies were:

Timeline since 1991

See also
President of Serbia
Prime Minister of Serbia

References

Serbia, National Assembly
 
Lists of members of parliament
President of the National Assembly
President of the National Assembly